Sidney M. Schreiber (1915–2009) was an associate justice of the New Jersey Supreme Court from 1975 to 1984. His notable opinions on the court include expanding citizen access to public beaches and increasing consumer protection from drug companies. He also serves in the United States Army from 1943 to 1946.

Early life and military service
Born in New York City, Schreiber grew up in Elizabeth, NJ. He graduated Phi Beta Kappa from Yale University in 1936. He earned his law degree at Yale Law School.

Legal career and military service
Schreiber began his legal career working as a staff attorney for the United States Railroad Retirement Board and the Securities and Exchange Commission. He put his personal career on hold in 1943, when he joined the United States Army during World War II.  He served until 1946 and reached the position of lieutenant. Perhaps the highlight of his service was heading the War Crimes Review Section of the Judge Advocate's Office for the Third Army. In that position, he drafted documents for war crime trials involving German concentration camp.

After the war, Schreiber entered private practice. He also had the privilege of serving as a delegate to the 1966 New Jersey Constitutional Convention, which rewrote many of New Jersey's legislative articles. He also served as a Commissioner for the Union County Parks Commission.

In recognition of his service to New Jersey and the country, Governor William T. Cahill nominated Schreiber to the Superior Court in Hudson County in October 1972. Schreiber was later promoted to the New Jersey Supreme Court by former Governor Brendan Byrne in 1975. He served on the court for nine years.

When he retired from the bench in 1984, Schreiber joined the law firm Riker, Danzig, Scherer, Hyland & Perretti, in Morristown, New Jersey. While at the firm, Schreiber was an esteemed member of the firm's government affairs department, leading the department to be recognized among of the state's most influential practices.

In 1997 he was awarded with the William J. Brennan Award from the Association of the Federal Bar of New Jersey for his lifetime commitment to the New Jersey legal profession.

Notable decisions
Schreiber was involved in many of the New Jersey Supreme Court's public-focused opinions of the late 1970s. During his tenure, he wrote the majority decisions that expanded the power of living wills, extended citizen access to public beaches, and clarified the responsibilities of drug companies to guard against suspected harmful side effects.

While on the bench, he also served as Chairman of the Supreme Court Committee on Civil Case Management and Procedures and as Chairman of the Committee on Budget and Procedure.

See also
List of justices of the Supreme Court of New Jersey

References

1915 births
2009 deaths
Justices of the Supreme Court of New Jersey
New Jersey lawyers
Yale Law School alumni
Yale University alumni
People from Elizabeth, New Jersey
20th-century American judges
20th-century American lawyers
United States Army personnel of World War II